Xu Dong (born 18 January 1979) is a Chinese weightlifter. He competed in the men's bantamweight event at the 1996 Summer Olympics.

References

1979 births
Living people
Chinese male weightlifters
Olympic weightlifters of China
Weightlifters at the 1996 Summer Olympics
Place of birth missing (living people)
20th-century Chinese people